The Alliance of the periphery or the Periphery doctrine is a foreign policy strategy that called for Israel to develop close strategic alliances with non-Arab Muslim states in the Middle East to counteract the united opposition of Arab states to the existence of Israel. It was developed by David Ben-Gurion, the first Prime Minister of Israel, and employed chiefly towards Turkey, pre-revolutionary Iran and Imperial Ethiopia (including Eritrea), as well as the Kurdish community across the Middle East such as in Iraq and in Iran (in this case, particularly within Arab States such as Iraq and Syria).

Background
The Arab–Israeli conflict was seen for many decades as primarily a conflict between Arab states and Israel, rather than a pan-Islamic one. Thus, nations such as Turkey and Iran, which were considered rivals of Arab states for regional dominance, were steadily cultivated by the Israeli government, which sought broader acceptance of its legitimate existence and security from nations in the region as well as seeking a window for future communication, negotiations and normalization of ties with Arab states. The goals of the Israeli government coincided with the policies of the Turkish and Iranian governments of the time. Turkey sought integration with the free-market economies and democracies of Europe, and is a member of the North Atlantic Treaty Organization (NATO) and a candidate for membership in the European Union. The Shah of Iran was a major ally of the United States, which facilitated the dialogue between Israel, Iran and Turkey.

The principle was also applied towards the Kurdish people, who constitute significant minorities in Turkey, Iran, Iraq and Syria. Israeli government officials provided extensive support to Kurdish political parties and their aspirations for greater self-government and even independence. Kurdistan Region has maintained open ties with Israel and is an influential lobby for the establishment of normal diplomatic relations between Israel and Iraq.

Development
In 1950, both Turkey and Iran became the first and for a long time, the only Muslim states to establish diplomatic relations with Israel. Both Turkey and Iran developed close relations with Israel that involved extensive military cooperation. Israel aided the industrial and military development in Turkey and Iran. During the 1967 Six-Day War, Iran supplied Israel with essential oil and petroleum. Israel also made significant progress in achieving normal relations with Ethiopia, Nigeria and India, all nations with significant Muslim populations. After the dissolution of the Soviet Union, Israel managed to establish relations with the newly independent Muslim republics of Central Asia such as Kazakhstan, Tajikistan and others. However, Israeli overtures to Indonesia, Afghanistan, Pakistan and Malaysia were rebuffed.

Unravelling
The overthrow of the Shah of Iran in 1979 was a major setback for the policy. The Islamic regime of Iran severed relations with Israel, and its leaders such as Ruhollah Khomeini, Ali Khamenei and Mahmoud Ahmadinejad have repeatedly called it an "illegal entity" and even advocated for its destruction. The doctrine led to questionable attempts by Israel to establish good relations with the avowedly anti-Zionist Islamic Republic of Iran after the Islamic Revolution. The Israelis sold weaponry and know-how to Iran during the Iran-Iraq war, and assisted Iran in the sale of its oil.

See also
 Iran–Israel relations
 Foreign relations of Israel
 Israeli–Sunni Coalition
 Israel–Kurdistan Region relations
 Prometheism

References

External links
 Whither the Persian-Jewish alliance? Trita Parsi
  Treacherous Alliance By Trita Parsi

Foreign relations of Israel
David Ben-Gurion